Pomolispondylus (meaning "knobbly vertebra" in Greek) is an extinct genus of reptile known from the Early Triassic Jialingjiang Formation of China. It contains a single species, Pomolispondylus biani.

Phylogenetic analysis found it to be most closely related to Saurosphargidae, a Middle Triassic family of marine reptiles. The describing authors erected a new group, Saurosphargiformes, including both Pomolispondylus and Saurosphargidae.

References

Fossil taxa described in 2022
Early Triassic reptiles of Asia
Prehistoric reptile genera